This is a list of radio stations in Southland, New Zealand.

Most Southland stations broadcast to Invercargill or Gore.

Full power stations

FM stations

AM stations

Low power FM stations (LPFM)

References

Southland
Radio stations